San Diego State University Transit Center is a station on San Diego Trolley's Green Line. The station is underground (the only such station in the system) and has side platforms. The station is located in the Aztec Green on the south portion of the campus of San Diego State University. The station entrances are between College Avenue and Campanile Drive. The station is very popular with students and staff who commute to the university because of the high cost and low availability of parking around campus.

History
In 1989, the San Diego Metropolitan Transit Development Board began developing plans for an additional trolley line connecting its Blue and Orange lines. The new line was initially expected to cost $506 million and cover 5.6 miles of track. After initially looking at over ten different routes to connect the two lines, the Board initially recommended connecting San Diego State University at the north end of its campus, near Interstate 8. However SDSU officials wanted the trolley station to go through the center of the campus, which would require tunneling underneath the campus. The Board initially balked at this concept as it would increase construction costs by $40–50 million. Once the Board learned that tunneling would be cheaper than purchasing adjacent land they agreed to alter the route. Final construction costs for the new trolley station were $103 million. Construction for the new trolley line first began in 1999.

Construction
Several methods were used to excavate the tunnel that would contain the station and the tracks to be used for the trolleys to pass underneath the campus. 2,915 feet (of the total 4,000 feet of track) were excavated using the cut-and-cover method where a current road above the tunnel would have its pavement removed, the underlying ground entrenched, and the pavement for the road re-added. For the remaining 1,085 feet, the New Austrian Tunnelling method was used, which required the use of the geological stress of the surrounding rock mass to stabilize the tunnel.

Construction of the tunnel and station was designed (Began in September 1998) to minimally disrupt the campus and, as a result, it was halted during the opening weeks of each semester as well as finals. The station opened in September 2005 with sold out tickets purchased by students.

Design
The trolley station was designed by the architect firm ZGF Architects. The station was initially designed to limit the noise of the passing trolleys, so as to not disturb classes on campus. In addition to blue cold cathode lighting, natural light enters the station from the street level above through 20 openings.

Dedication
On June 29, 2011, the station was dedicated to Leon Williams, an SDSU alumnus and a former MTS board chair who was instrumental in bringing the light rail line to the heart of the SDSU campus.

Station layout
There are two tracks, each served by a side platform.

Bus connections
San Diego Metropolitan Transit System: 11, 14, 15, 115, Rapid 215, 856, 936, 955

See also
 List of San Diego Trolley stations

References

Green Line (San Diego Trolley)
San Diego Trolley stations in San Diego
Transit Center
Railway stations in California at university and college campuses
Railway stations in the United States opened in 2005
Railway stations located underground in California
Underground rapid transit in the United States
2005 establishments in California